Yvan Le Bolloc'h (born 20 December 1961, in Brest) is a French television and radio host and actor.

Biography
Yvan Le Bolloc'h began as a teacher for four years in Brittany. He worked regularly with Bruno Solo and presented with him several music programs on Canal + in the 1990s (Top 50 and Le plein de super), until the creation of the television series Caméra Café in 2001–2004 on M6 and its movie adaptation under the title Espace détente. He also made a brief appearance on the M6 series Kaamelott by Alexandre Astier.

He participated in the show On va pas s'gêner, hosted by Laurent Ruquier, on Europe 1, then in On a tout essayé, on France 2.

Yvan Le Bolloc'h is also a musician and has played guitar for many years. He is a member of a gypsy music group, inspired by the Gipsy Kings, named Ma guitare s'appelle revient.

Political commitment
On 1 May 2007, he hosted Ségolène Royal`s rally in the Charlety stadium.

In 2017, he supported Jean-Luc Mélenchon and his party La France Insoumise during the 2017 French presidential election.

Filmography
 1999 : Cuisine chinoise by Frédérique Feder
 2000 : On fait comme on a dit by Philippe Bérenger
 2001 : Moulin à paroles by Pascal Rémy
 2001 : Le Mal du pays by Laurent Bachettrage
 2001 : J'ai faim !!! by Florence Quentin
 2003 : Les Clefs de bagnole by Laurent Baffie
 2004 : Espace détente by Bruno Solo and d'Yvan Le Bolloc'h
 2007 : Le Bénévole by Jean-Pierre Mocky
 2009 : Le Séminaire by Charles Nemes
 2017 : Caméra Café : Origins

Television
 1991-1993 : Le Top 50
 1993 : Le Plein de super
 2001-2004 : Caméra café
 2005 : Kaamelott

Theater
 1999 : Un barrage contre le Pacifique by Marguerite Duras, Théâtre International de Langue Française, Théâtre Antoine in 2000
 2008 : Les Deux Canards by Tristan Bernard

References

External links
  Official site
 

1961 births
French television presenters
Actors from Brest, France
Living people
French male film actors
French male television actors
French male stage actors